Mukhangal is a 1982 Indian Malayalam film, directed by P. Chandrakumar.  The film has musical score by A. T. Ummer.

Cast
K. R. Vijaya as Prabha Menon
Sankaradi as Panikker
Shubha as Vinodhini
Sukumaran as Doctor balachandran
Meena as Rukmini
Nellikode Bhaskaran as Thomas
T. P. Madhavan as Raghavan Nair
Jose as Ravi
K. P. Ummer as Venu Menon
KPAC Sunny as Roy

Soundtrack
The music was composed by A. T. Ummer and the lyrics were written by Sathyan Anthikkad.

References

External links
 

1982 films
1980s Malayalam-language films
Films scored by A. T. Ummer
Films directed by P. Chandrakumar